Shahnaz is a Bangladeshi film actress. She acted in Sotter Mrittu Nei in 1996 where her co-star was Salman Shah.

Selected filmography
 Sotter Mrittu Nei
 Top Somrat
 Ondho Ain
 Top Leader
 Mohot
 Monafek
 Bidrohi Konya
 Chalbaz
 Kolizar Tukra
 Banglar Ma
 Oshantir Agun
 Himmot
 Deshdrohi
 Prem Keno Kaday
 Dui Chor
 Time Nai
 Badha
 Bijli Tufan
 Lathi
 Asami Greftar
 Shanto Keno Mastan
 Atmotyag
 Bishwo Batpar
 Adorer Chhotovai
 Jomela Sundori
 Mayer Kosom
 Raja Keno Sontrasi
 Dushmon Dunia
 Ore Sampanwala
 Baba Mastan
 Ami Ek Omanush
 Lalu Kosai

References

External links
 

Bangladeshi film actresses
Living people
Year of birth missing (living people)
Best Supporting Actress Bachsas Award winners